
Gmina Łaszczów is an urban-rural gmina (administrative district) in Tomaszów Lubelski County, Lublin Voivodeship, in eastern Poland.

Before 1 January 2010 (when Łaszczów became a town) it was classed as a rural gmina.

Villages
As well as the town of Łaszczów, Gmina Łaszczów contains the villages and settlements of Czerkasy, Dobużek, Dobużek-Kolonia, Domaniż, Hopkie, Hopkie-Kolonia, Kmiczyn, Kmiczyn-Kolonia, Łaszczów-Kolonia, Małoniż, Muratyn, Muratyn-Kolonia, Nabróż, Nabróż-Kolonia, Nadolce, Pieniany, Pieniany-Kolonia, Podlodów, Pukarzów, Pukarzów-Kolonia, Ratyczów, Steniatyn, Steniatyn-Kolonia, Wólka Pukarzowska, Zimno and Zimno-Kolonia.

Neighbouring gminas
Gmina Łaszczów is bordered by the gminas of Jarczów, Mircze, Rachanie, Telatyn, Tyszowce and Ulhówek.

References

 Polish official population figures 2006

Laszczow
Tomaszów Lubelski County